Viktor Aloisius Reko, (born 3 August 1880 in Vienna) was an Austrian teacher and scientific author who moved to Mexico in 1921. He is best known for his popular book Magische Gifte: Rausch- und Betäubungsmittel der Neuen Welt ("Magic Poisons: Inebriating and Narcotic Substances of the New World"), first published in 1936. This book recorded a number of second-hand observations on New World psychoactive drugs, paraphrased from notes he took of conversations with his cousin, the eminent Mexican ethnobotanist Dr. Blas Pablo Reko, including the first published refutation of Dr. William Edwin Safford's uncharacteristically untenable assertion that teonanácatl was not a mushroom, but a cactus. 

Reko's book also covered the following drugs, many of which were not mentioned in the earlier book Phantastica by Louis Lewin: sinicuichi (Heimia spp.) for which he claimed psychoactivity, Ololiúqui (Turbina corymbosa), peyotl (Lophophora williamsii), marihuana (Cannabis sativa), toloachi (Datura stramonium var. tatula), ayahuasca, colorines (Erythrina and Sophora species), coztic-zapote (Pouteria campechiana),  (Gelsemium sempervirens), camotillo (Dioscorea composita), and cohombrillo (Ecballium elaterium). The second edition also contained chicalote (supposedly obtained from a cross between Argemone mexicana and Papaver somniferum), minapatli (Sebastiania pavoniana, Mexican jumping bean), and herbas locas (Dioon edule, Astragalus amphyoxys, and Oxytropis lambertii).

Victor A. Reko became a member of the Mexican Academy of Sciences.

See also 

 Louis Lewin, author of Phantastica

References 

Austrian non-fiction writers
Year of death missing
1880 births
Ethnobiologists
Austrian emigrants to Mexico